Fall River S.C. was an American soccer club based in Fall River, Massachusetts that was a member of the American Soccer League.

Year-by-year

Soccer clubs in Fall River, Massachusetts
Defunct soccer clubs in Massachusetts
American Soccer League (1933–1983) teams
1957 establishments in Massachusetts
1963 disestablishments in Massachusetts
Association football clubs established in 1957
Association football clubs disestablished in 1963